The Canon EOS R6 is a midrange full-frame mirrorless interchangeable-lens camera produced by Canon. The camera was announced by Canon on July 9, 2020, alongside the EOS R5.

Features

 20.1-megapixel full-frame CMOS sensor 
 4K 10-bit video recording at up to 60 fps 
 1080p video recording at up to 120 fps 
 100% autofocus coverage 
 1,053 autofocus points 
 Native ISO range of 100 to 102,400; expandable to 204,800 
 High-speed continuous shooting of up to 12 fps with mechanical shutter and electronic 1st curtain, and up to 20 fps with the electronic shutter 
 5-axis in-body image stabilization which can provide up to 8 stops of shake correction 
 Dual UHS-II SD memory card slots 
 0.5" 3.69 million dots OLED electronic viewfinder with a 120 fps refresh rate, and a vari-angle LCD touchscreen 
 Dual Pixel CMOS AF II 
 Built-in Wi-Fi and Bluetooth connectivity 
 Optional battery grip 
 DIGIC X image processor

References

External links
 
  
 Canon EOS R6 

Canon RF-mount cameras
Cameras introduced in 2020
Full-frame mirrorless interchangeable lens cameras